There are two buildings named Hearst Tower:
Hearst Tower (Manhattan)
Hearst Tower (Charlotte)